The 1990 FIG Rhythmic Gymnastics World Cup was the third edition of the Rhythmic Gymnastics World Cup, held in Brussels, Belgium. The competition was officially organized by the International Gymnastics Federation.

Medalists

Medal table

See also
 World Rhythmic Gymnastics Championships
 FIG World Cup
 List of medalists at the FIG World Cup Final

References

Rhythmic Gymnastics World Cup
International gymnastics competitions hosted by Belgium
1990 in gymnastics